Athyrium asplenioides, or southern lady fern, is a species of the family Athyriaceae. It is a deciduous fern and reaches a height between 1 and 3 feet

Its specific epithet asplenioides means "Asplenium-like". Many botanists instead considered it a variety of the common lady-fern, making it Athyrium filix-femina (L.) Roth, var. asplenioides (Michx.) Farwell.

References

External links
 USDA Profile

asplenioides
Ferns of the United States
Plants described in 1803